Steph Cha is a Korean American novelist and fiction writer, who has released three novels in the crime fiction genre about her detective protagonist Juniper Song, Follow Her Home (2013), Beware Beware (2014) and Dead Soon Enough (2015). Her most recent book is the stand-alone crime fiction novel, Your House Will Pay (2019), which won the LA Times Book Award.

Background
Cha was born in Van Nuys, California in 1986. She subsequently grew up in Encino, California with her mother, father and two younger brothers. She attended Harvard-Westlake School in Studio City. Cha graduated from Stanford University, where she studied English and East Asian Studies, and also completed a Juris Doctor degree from Yale Law School.

Work

Novels
In 2013, Cha published her first Juniper Song mystery, Follow Her Home (2013) with Minotaur Books, an imprint of St. Martin's Press and Macmillan Publishers. The book has received positive reviews from the Los Angeles Times, Kirkus Reviews, Publishers Weekly, Library Journal, Hyphen Magazine, KoreAm Journal, and other publications. The sequel Beware Beware  (2014) was published the following year in 2014, also by Minotaur Books. The third novel in the series, Dead Soon Enough was published by Minotaur Books in 2015.

Other Writing
Cha also has published freelance book reviews and food writing for the Los Angeles Times (serving as a restaurant scout and a protégé of sorts for LA Times' Pulitzer-Prize winning food critic Jonathan Gold), humor pieces for Trop Magazine and a short story entitled "Treasures in Heaven" in the Winter 2013 Fiction  Issue of the Los Angeles Review of Books.

Cha has also written more than 2,400 reviews on Yelp, according to a Los Angeles Times interview, and has held the "Elite" reviewer title for more than six years in a row, according to an interview with The Rumpus.

Bibliography

Novels

Juniper Song mysteries

Other novels

Short Stories
Treasures in Heaven (Los Angeles Review of Books, Winter 2013)

Awards

References

External links
Steph Cha's Official Site
Steph Cha Interview in the LA Times
Steph Cha Interview in The Rumpus
MacMillan Author Page for Steph Cha

Stanford University alumni
Yale Law School alumni
21st-century American novelists
American writers of Korean descent
Living people
1986 births
American novelists of Asian descent
21st-century American women writers